Clifton Bledsoe Cates (August 31, 1893 – June 4, 1970) was a United States Marine Corps four-star general who served as the 19th Commandant of the Marine Corps from 1948 to 1951. He was honored for his heroism during World War I at the Battle of Belleau Wood, and for his inspired combat leadership at the Battle of Iwo Jima in World War II. He is considered one of the most distinguished young officers of World War I. Cates was one of the few officers from any branch of service to have commanded a platoon, a company, a battalion, a regiment, and a division each in combat.

Early life
Clifton Bledsoe Cates was born August 31, 1893, in Tiptonville, Tennessee. After graduating from the Missouri Military Academy in 1910, and the University of Tennessee College of Law in 1916 with a Bachelor of Law degree, he was admitted to the Tennessee Bar. Cates was a member of the Kappa Tau Chapter of Phi Gamma Delta.

Military career
With the entry of the United States into World War I, Cates was commissioned as second lieutenant in the Marine Corps Reserves. He began active duty on June 13, 1917.

World War I
During World War I, Cates served with the 6th Marine Regiment, fighting in France. For his heroism in the Aisne defensive at Boursches and Belleau Wood, he was awarded the Navy Cross, the Distinguished Service Cross with oak leaf cluster—one of only nine Marines to receive two in World War I—in addition to the Purple Heart. He was awarded a Silver Star for his gallantry at Soissons. Cates was also recognized by the French government with the Legion of Honor, one of the greatest compliments that could be paid any officer, and the Croix de Guerre with Gilt Star and two palms. At Belleau Wood, June 6, 1918, Cates' company was ordered to attack the village of [Bouresches] The company commander was soon mortally wounded, leaving Cates in charge despite his not knowing the attack's intent or objective. Cates organized the available men of his company as well as some other Marines in the vicinity and carried out a successful attack, and subsequent defense of the village. The Germans responded with mustard gas nearly wiping out the entire company. Cates was reassigned to the 80th Company until replacements could reconstitute his 79th. On July 19, 1918, at the Battle of Soissons, most of Cates' company along with the 2nd Battalion was annihilated. The enemy artillery was so intense that Cates lost most of his britches in an explosion that nearly cost him his life. After capturing an old abandoned French trench, he sent a runner to his battalion headquarters with a situation report which read: "From Co. "H" At:? Date: July 19. Hour 10:45A.M. To: Lt. Col Lee. "I am in an old abandoned French trench bordering on the road leading out of your P.C. and 350 yards from an old mill. I have only two men out of my company. We need support, but it is almost suicide to try and get it here as we are swept by machine-gun fire and a constant barrage is on us. I have no one on my left and only a few on my right. I WILL HOLD." "I will hold" became the phrase most identified with Cates as he advanced through the ranks, and is recognized throughout the Marine Corps as a battle cry or slogan intended to improve morale and inspire confidence.

Interbellum
Cates returned to the United States in September 1919 after occupation duties in Germany. He was prepared to resign his commission until dissuaded by Major General George Barnett, who took Cates on as his aide-de-camp and he served as a White House aide. In 1920, he stayed as Barnett's aide and followed him to San Francisco, California.

In 1929, Cates was deployed to Shanghai, China, where he rejoined the 4th Marines for three years. He then returned to the United States for training at the Army Industrial College and in the Senior Course in the Marine Corps Schools. In 1935, Cates was assigned to the War Plans Section of the Division of Operations and Training at Headquarters Marine Corps (HQMC). In 1936, he returned to Shanghai as a battalion commander with the 6th Marine Regiment. In 1938, he rejoined the 4th Marines in Shanghai.

In 1940, Cates was named the director of the Marine Officers Basic School at the Philadelphia Navy Yard. In 1942, Colonel Cates took command of the 1st Marine Regiment.

World War II
Cates led the 1st Marines at Guadalcanal, for which he was awarded the Legion of Merit with Combat "V". He then assumed command of the 4th Marine Division in the Marianas operation, the Tinian campaign and the seizure of Iwo Jima. For his services at Tinian, Cates received the Navy Distinguished Service Medal and a Gold Star in lieu of a second award for his service at Iwo Jima. The planning for Tinian included the first complete aerial reconnaissance of an enemy base by the key commanders, including Cates. Near the end of the fighting at Iwo Jima, Cates attempted to persuade the remaining Japanese brigade to surrender honorably rather than fight to the death.

After his first tour of duty in the Pacific, Cates returned to the United States to serve as commandant of the Marine Corps Schools at Quantico until 1944. He then returned to the Pacific theater until the end of the war as commander of the 4th Marine Division.

Commandant
On January 1, 1948, Cates was sworn in as the 19th commandant of the Marine Corps and promoted to the rank of general. He served as commandant for four years, and fought the budgetary erosion of the Fleet Marine Force. As Commandant, Cates continued the push to enlarge the Corps standing forces, eventually getting legislation placing the Corps active strength at three divisions and three air wings, and he brought the first helicopters into service on a test basis of the "new concept" in the Korean War—the usage of which would make an impression on the Commander of the FMF, Pacific, his eventual successor as commandant General Lemuel C. Shepherd, Jr. Shepherd and Cates would revive the amphibious assault at Inchon.

Upon completion of his tour as Commandant of the Marine Corps, Cates was reverted to his then permanent rank of lieutenant general and was reassigned to serve again as commandant of the Marine Corps Schools. He retired on June 30, 1954, and was eventually promoted on the retired list to the rank of full general. After retirement he was chairman of the National Campaign of the United Service Organizations for two years.

Death and legacy
Cates died June 4, 1970, at the United States Naval Hospital, Annapolis, Maryland, after a long illness. He was buried with full military honors on June 8, 1970, at Arlington National Cemetery.

General Cates also held doctoral law degrees from the University of Tennessee and the University of Chattanooga.

Cates' high school alma mater, the Missouri Military Academy in Mexico, Missouri, honored his memory with the creation of the "General Clifton B. Cates 'I Will Hold' Award for Leadership" during the academy's 125th anniversary celebration in 2014. The award specifically recognizes the leadership traits of perseverance and determination.

Dates of rank

Assignments

Awards and decorations
Cates was the recipient of the following awards:

Navy Cross citation
Citation:

The President of the United States of America takes pleasure in presenting the Navy Cross to First Lieutenant Clifton Bledsoe Cates (MCSN: 0-155), United States Marine Corps, for extraordinary heroism while serving with the 96th Company, 6th Regiment (Marines), 2d Division, A.E.F. in action near Chateau-Thierry, France, 6 June 1918. While advancing with his company on the town of Bouresches their progress was greatly hindered by withering machine-gun and artillery fire of the enemy which caused many casualties, one of whom was his commanding officer. Taking command, Captain Cates led them on to the objective despite the fact that he was rendered temporarily unconscious by a bullet striking his helmet and that this was his first engagement. Exposing himself to the extreme hazard, he reorganized his position with but a handful of men.

First Distinguished Service Cross citation
Citation:

The President of the United States of America, authorized by Act of Congress, July 9, 1918, takes pleasure in presenting the Distinguished Service Cross to Captain Clifton Bledsoe Cates (MCSN: 0-155), United States Marine Corps, for extraordinary heroism while serving with the Ninety-Sixth Company, Sixth Regiment (Marines), 2d Division, A.E.F., in action near Chateau-Thierry, France, 6 June 1918. While advancing with his company on the town of Bouresches their progress was greatly hindered by withering machine-gun and artillery fire of the enemy which caused many casualties, one of whom was his commanding officer. Taking command, Captain Cates led them on to the objective despite the fact that he was rendered temporarily unconscious by a bullet striking his helmet and that this was his first engagement. Exposing himself to the extreme hazard, he reorganized his position with but a handful of men.

Second Distinguished Service Cross citation
Citation:

The President of the United States of America, authorized by Act of Congress, July 9, 1918, takes pleasure in presenting a Bronze Oak Leaf Cluster in lieu of a Second Award of the Distinguished Service Cross to Captain Clifton Bledsoe Cates (MCSN: 0-155), United States Marine Corps, for extraordinary heroism while serving with the Ninety-Sixth Company, Sixth Regiment (Marines), 2d Division, A.E.F., in action near Bois-de-Belleau, France, June 13–14, 1918. During the night, a severe gas attack made it necessary to evacuate practically the entire personnel of two companies, including officers. Captain Cates, suffering painfully from wounds, refused evacuation remaining and rendering valuable assistance to another company.

See also
List of United States Marine Corps four-star generals

References

External links
 
 

|-

Military personnel from Tennessee
1893 births
1970 deaths
United States Marine Corps personnel of World War I
Battle of Iwo Jima
Burials at Arlington National Cemetery
Chevaliers of the Légion d'honneur
Knights Grand Cross of the Order of Orange-Nassau
People educated at Missouri Military Academy
People from Tiptonville, Tennessee
Recipients of the Croix de Guerre 1914–1918 (France)
Recipients of the Distinguished Service Cross (United States)
Recipients of the Navy Distinguished Service Medal
Recipients of the Legion of Merit
Recipients of the Navy Cross (United States)
Recipients of the Silver Star
United States Army War College alumni
United States Marine Corps Commandants
United States Marine Corps generals
United States Marine Corps World War II generals
University of Tennessee alumni
Dwight D. Eisenhower School for National Security and Resource Strategy alumni